Lees Football Club is a defunct Cork-based Gaelic Athletic Association club on the southside of Cork city, Ireland.  The club was founded in 1886 and was primarily concerned with the game of Gaelic football. The club had a strong association with the Lee Rowing Club and the teams were largely made up of West Cork men working in the city.
 
 By the late 1920s the club was almost defunct and at the 1929 AGM of a rival club, Nils, the chairman "stressed the fact that Gaelic Football was in a deplorable state in the city at the present time, and teams of long connection with the GAA like Nils and Lees, found it almost impossible to put a single senior team on the field when a couple of years back they could put senior, intermediate and junior teams. There was certainly work for an organiser here to organise Gaelic football in Cork City and help to bring it back to the high position in the GAA which it held some years back."
 
 Lees spent 111 years on top of the Cork SFC Roll of Honour
—including 98 consecutive years—and were only passed by Nemo Rangers in 2002. Their total of 111 years is the fourth best in SFC history behind Commercials Limerick (122 years), Tullamore GAA (115 years) and Ballina Stephenites (115 years).

History

Honours
All-Ireland Senior Football Championships: 1
 1911
Cork Senior Football Championships: 12
 1887, 1888, 1896, 1902, 1903, 1904, 1907, 1908, 1911, 1914, 1923, 1955

Famous players

 Mort O'Shea
 Mick Mehigan
 P. A. Murphy
 Nealie Duggan
 Pádraig Tyers
 Donal O'Sullivan

References

Gaelic games clubs in County Cork
Gaelic football clubs in County Cork